The 2016 Asian Olympic Shooting Qualifying Tournament was held in New Delhi, India between January 27 and February 3. This tournament was the Asian qualifying tournament for the 2016 Summer Olympics in Rio, after the 2015 Asian Shooting Championships was stripped of its status after the IOC suspended Kuwait NOC.

The National Rifle Association of India hosted this international competition at Dr. Karni Singh Shooting Range in New Delhi. The competition had three separate disciplines: Rifle, Pistol and Shotgun.

Participating nations 
A total of 538 shooters representing 30 countries participated in this event.

 (hosts)

Medal summary

Rifle events

Pistol events

ShotGun events

Medal table 
Final standing.

2016 Olympic Quota Obtained

2016 Olympic Quota Obtained by Nations and Independent Athletes 

A total of 35 quota places for the Rio 2016 Olympic Games will be awarded based on this event.

References

Official website 
 http://www.thenrai.in/
 ISSF Website

Shooting
Asian Olympic Shooting
2016 in Indian sport